USS Richard P. Leary (DD-664) was a  of the United States Navy. In 1959, the ship was transferred to the Japanese Maritime Self-Defense Force and renamed Yūgure. The destroyer remained in service with the Japanese until 1974, when she was returned to the US, who then sold the ship for scrap in 1976.

Namesake

Richard Phillips Leary was born on 3 November 1842 in Baltimore, Maryland. He entered the United States Naval Academy in 1860. During the American Civil War, he served on the screw sloop  and the monitor  assigned to the Atlantic blockade.

During tension with Germany over Samoa, Leary commanded  at Samoa from October to December 1888. From 1899 into 1900, Captain Leary served as Naval Governor of Guam. Retiring in 1901, Rear Admiral Leary died on 27 December at Chelsea, Massachusetts.

Construction and career
Richard P. Leary was laid down on 4 July 1943 at the Boston Navy Yard, Boston, Massachusetts; launched 6 October 1943, sponsored by Mrs. George K. Crozer III; and commissioned 23 February 1944.

Service in the United States Navy
Following shakedown off Bermuda, Richard P. Leary sailed via the Panama Canal for Pearl Harbor. After escort duty to Eniwetok and Saipan in July, she supported the landings at Peleliu 15 September 1944, and at Leyte 20 October. During the Battle of Surigao Strait on 25 October, she launched torpedoes at the Japanese battleship , splashed one enemy plane, and guarded the damaged destroyer . While patrolling off Leyte Gulf on 1 November, she rescued 70 survivors of the destroyer .

During the Lingayen Gulf campaign, Richard P. Leary on 6 January, during a suicide attack, she severely damaged an incoming Nakajima J1N "Irving" fighter, which managed to graze the forward 5-inch gun mounts before crashing—the only damage of the war. Later that day, she also shot down a Nakajima B6N “Jill” and rendered fire-support for the landings on 9 January.

The Leary again supplied gunfire support for the landings at Iwo Jima 19 February, and was assigned to Task Force 54 (TF 54) for the invasion of Okinawa, supplying gunfire support for the assault landings on 1 April. During the night of 6–7 April she escorted the damaged destroyer  to Kerama Retto, Okinawa Gunto.

Upon completion of duties at Okinawa her next assignment took her to Adak, Alaska, in August. After serving in the Aleutians, Leary sailed for Japan arriving at Ominato, 8 September. She departed Japan on 30 September, and steamed to San Diego, California.

Designated for inactivation after her return, Richard P. Leary decommissioned 10 December 1946, and was assigned to the Pacific Reserve Fleet.

Service in the Japanese Maritime Self-Defense Force 

Richard P. Leary, along with her sister ship, was transferred 10 March 1959 to Japan, where she served in the Japan Maritime Self-Defense Force as JDS Yūgure (DD-184) ("Autumn Twilight").

The ship was returned to U.S. custody 10 March 1974, stricken from the U.S. Naval Vessel Register on 18 March, and sold for scrap 1 July 1976.

Richard P. Leary received six battle stars for World War II service.

References

External links 
USS Richard P. Leary home page at Destroyer History Foundation
navsource.org: USS Richard P. Leary
hazegray.org: USS Richard P. Leary

 

Fletcher-class destroyers of the United States Navy
Ships built in Boston
1943 ships
World War II destroyers of the United States
Fletcher-class destroyers of the Japan Maritime Self-Defense Force